The Black Country Ring is a UK canal ring composed of the Staffordshire and Worcestershire Canal, Birmingham Main Line, Birmingham and Fazeley Canal, Coventry Canal and Trent and Mersey Canal.

References

 

Canals in England